Telephirca quadrifariella is a moth of the family Autostichidae and the only species in the genus Telephirca. It is found on Corsica and Sardinia.

The forewings are black with whitish scales. The hindwings are grey.

References

Moths described in 1855
Telephirca
Moths of Europe
Monotypic moth genera